The Anthony Muñoz Award is given annually to the best lineman in the high school football at U.S. Army All-American Bowl banquet. It is comparable to the Outland Trophy for collegiate football players.

The award was established in 2009 in honor of Anthony Muñoz. Its inaugural winner was Seantrel Henderson.

Past winners

References

High school football trophies and awards in the United States